Aluminon, the triammonium salt of aurintricarboxylic acid, is a dye often used to detect the presence of the aluminium ion in an aqueous solution. Aluminon forms a red complex salt in combination with Al3+.

In addition to its use in qualitative inorganic analysis, aluminon has applications in pigment production. It forms brilliantly colored lake pigments with many metals. The pigments are red in combination with Be2+ and Ga3+. The pigment is deep purple or reddish-brown in combination with Fe3+. Color of a particular pigment in acidic solutions may change: aluminon and Sc3+ form red pigments if the solution is acidic, but otherwise the solutions are colorless.

Aluminon is prepared by reacting sodium nitrite with salicylic acid, adding formaldehyde, then treating with ammonia.

See also
Analytical chemistry
Colorimetry

References

Analytical chemistry
Analytical reagents
Chemical tests
Triarylmethane dyes
Salicylates
Ammonium compounds
3-Hydroxypropenals